The Facebook Football Awards is an awards which is only for the English Premier League. Which was announced in April 2015. In 2016, it was announced for various leagues around Europe. It is associated with Facebook, with La Liga awards associated with MARCA.

Winners in 2015
Awards were issued only to the Premier League in 2015.

Premier League
Player of the Year: Alexis Sánchez
Manager of the Year: Arsène Wenger

Winners in 2016

La Liga
Player of the Year: Cristiano Ronaldo
Best Striker: Cristiano Ronaldo
Best Defender: Marcelo
Best Midfielder: Luka Modrić
Best Goalkeeper: Keylor Navas
Best Breakthrough: Cedric Bakambu
Best Goal: James Rodríguez
Best Manager: Diego Simeone
Best Supporters: The supporters of Real Madrid

Premier League
Player of the Year: Riyad Mahrez
Young Player of the Year: Anthony Martial
Manager of the Year: Claudio Ranieri
Team of the Year: Three Leicester City and three Tottenham Hotspur players was included in team of the year. Manchester United were also represented with two players, as well as one apiece from Arsenal, West Ham United and Manchester City

Bundesliga
Player of the Year: Pierre-Emerick Aubameyang
New Comer of the Year: Julian Weigl
Best Manager: Pep Guardiola

References

External links
 Facebook Media
 Official results by Marca

Association football trophies and awards
Facebook
Awards established in 2015